Ernest Hammond (29 July 1850 – 31 July 1921) was an English cricketer.  Hammond was a right-handed batsman who bowled roundarm right-arm slow.  He was born at Storrington, Sussex.

Hammond made his first-class debut for Sussex against Surrey at The Oval in 1874.  He made four further first-class appearances for Sussex, the last of which came against Hampshire in 1875.  He struggled in his five first-class matches, scoring just 16 runs at an average of 2.28, with a high score of 5.

He died at the village of his birth on 31 July 1921.  His grandfather John Hammond and uncle Charles Hammond both played first-class cricket.

References

External links
Ernest Hammond at ESPNcricinfo
Ernest Hammond at CricketArchive

1850 births
1921 deaths
People from Storrington
English cricketers
Sussex cricketers